SS American may refer to:

 , built by Harland and Wolff for the West India & Pacific Steam Navigation Co in 1895
 , one of the first ships of the American-Hawaiian Steamship Company; served in World War I as USS American (ID-2292); accidentally rammed and sank  in October 1918; renamed Honolulan in 1925 and scrapped in 1926 in Japan

See also 
 
 
 

Ship names